Şişli - Mecidiyeköy Metro Station (M2) is an underground metro station on the M2 line of the Istanbul metro and put into service on September 16, 2000.

The station is on Büyükdere Caddesi in Şişli's 19 Mayıs District.

The station has 6 entrances, namely Şişli, Fulya, Mecidiyeköy, Trump Towers AVM, Ortaklar Caddesi and Cevahir AVM.

Mecidiyeköy Metro Station (M7) is an underground metro station on the M7 line of the Istanbul metro and opened on October 28, 2020.

The station is located on Büyükdere Street in Şişli's Merkez and Fulya neighborhoods. The station is located on the lower level of the M2 platform.

M7 Metro Station is in the west corridor; Entrance number 1 is Mecidiyeköy Square, entrance number 2 is Metrobus / Bus Stops, entrance number 3 is Büyükdere Caddesi and entrance number 4 is Ortaklar Caddesi / M2 mecidiyeköy Metro Connection, entrance no 5 is Garage Street, entrance 6 is fire station.

Mecidiyeköy Metrobus Station is the metrobus stop serving the Metrobuses operated by IETT in Istanbul. The station is located in the Mecidiyeköy district of Şişli, on the D-100 Highway.

The station entered service on September 8, 2008.

In Mecidiyeköy, 3 lines are connected to each other with an underpass.

M2 Platform
Layout

M7 Platform
Layout

References

Railway stations opened in 2000
Istanbul metro stations
Şişli
2000 establishments in Turkey